Fira, originally known as Fira 2 – Pedrosa, is a Barcelona Metro station serving Fira de Barcelona's Fira Gran Via major trade fair venue and the Pedrosa industrial park, in the L'Hospitalet de Llobregat municipality, to the south-west of Barcelona. It is situated underneath Avinguda Joan Carles I, at the intersection with Pedrosa and Botànica streets. It has a direct access to Fira Gran Via's main entrance. The station was designed by Japanese architect Toyo Ito.

Designated L9 Sud ("L9 South"), the new Barcelona Metro line 9 section offers a regular service frequency of 7 minutes in each direction, though additional partial services may be added if necessary.

References

External links
 Information on the L9 Sud at the Transports Metropolitans de Barcelona website
 Information and photos of the station at trenscat.cat 

Barcelona Metro line 9 stations
Railway stations in Spain opened in 2016
Railway stations in L'Hospitalet de Llobregat